Mekdes Bekele Tadese (Amharic: መቅደስ በቀለ ታደሰ; born 20 January 1987) is an Ethiopian runner who specializes in the 3000 metres steeplechase.

Competition record

Personal bests
3000 metres steeplechase - 9:32.05 min (2007)
5000 metres - 15:49.71 min (2006)

External links
 

1987 births
Living people
Ethiopian female long-distance runners
Ethiopian female steeplechase runners
Olympic athletes of Ethiopia
Athletes (track and field) at the 2008 Summer Olympics
World Athletics Championships athletes for Ethiopia
African Games silver medalists for Ethiopia
African Games medalists in athletics (track and field)
Athletes (track and field) at the 2007 All-Africa Games
21st-century Ethiopian women